Andrzej Rżany (born September 26, 1973) is a boxer from Poland.

He participated in the 2004 Summer Olympics for his native European country. There he was stopped in the quarterfinals of the Flyweight (51 kg) division by Azerbaijan's eventual bronze medalist Fuad Aslanov.

Rżany won the bronze medal in the same division six months earlier, at the 2004 European Amateur Boxing Championships in Pula. In addition he won the bronze medal at the 1999 World Amateur Boxing Championships, and reached the quarterfinals at the 2000 Olympics.

Olympic results 
1992 (as a light Flyweight)
Lost to Rajendra Prasad (India) 6–12

2000 (as a flyweight)
Defeated Celestin Augustin (Madagascar) 15–13
Defeated Arlan Lerio (Philippines)
Lost to Wladimir Sidorenko (Ukraine) RSC 3

2004 (as a flyweight)
Defeated Bonyx Yusak Saweho (Indonesia) 25–19
Defeated Hicham Mesbahi (Morocco) 33–20
Lost to Fuad Aslanov (Azerbaijan) 21–22

External links
Yahoo! Sports

1973 births
Living people
Flyweight boxers
Boxers at the 1992 Summer Olympics
Boxers at the 2000 Summer Olympics
Boxers at the 2004 Summer Olympics
Olympic boxers of Poland
People from Mielec
Sportspeople from Podkarpackie Voivodeship
Polish male boxers
AIBA World Boxing Championships medalists